The 2019 Paradise Jam was an early-season men's and women's college basketball tournament. The tournament, which began in 2000, was part of the 2019-20 NCAA Division I men's basketball season and 2019-20 NCAA Division I women's basketball season.  The tournament was played at the Sports and Fitness Center in Saint Thomas, U.S. Virgin Islands, Nevada won the men's tournament defeating Bowling Green. in the women's tournament South Carolina won the women's Reef division, and Louisville won the Island division.

* – Denotes overtime period

Men's tournament

Non–Bracketed games

Bracket

Women's tournament

The women's tournament was played from November 28–20. The women's tournament consists of 8 teams split into two 4-team, round-robin divisions: Island and Reef.

Island Division

Reef Division

References

Paradise Jam Tournament
Paradise Jam Tournament
Paradise Jam
Paradise Jam